Wilson Automobile Manufacturing Company was a manufacturer of automobiles in Wilson, New York between 1903 and 1905.  Their automobile model was sold as the Niagara.

Other American automobile manufacturers that used the brand name Niagara were Niagara Automobile Company (1901) and Niagara Motor Vehicle Company, both of which had minimal, if any production.  Niagara Automobile Company (1915) used the brand Niagara and Niagara Motor Car Corporation called their automobile Lad's Car.

History 
The Niagara was a runabout model that could seat 2 or 4 passengers and sold for $850, .  The vertically mounted water-cooled single-cylinder engine, situated at the rear of the car, produced 5 hp (3.7 kW).  A 2-speed sliding transmission was fitted.  The steel and wood-framed car weighed 1100 lb (499 kg).  Full elliptic rear suspension and semi-elliptic front suspension was fitted.

The assets of the company were purchased by the La Salle-Niagara Company in 1905. Wilson became an automobile dealership.

References

 Frank Leslie's Popular Monthly (January, 1904)

Defunct motor vehicle manufacturers of the United States
Motor vehicle manufacturers based in New York (state)
Veteran vehicles
Defunct manufacturing companies based in New York (state)
Brass Era vehicles
1900s cars